Mahalakshmeeswarar Temple is a Hindu temple located in the village of Tirunindriyur in the Mayiladuthurai district of Tamil Nadu, India.

Location

The Mahalakshmeeswarar temple is located in the village of Tirunandriyur, 7 kilometres from Mayiladuthurai en route to Sirkazhi.

Significance 

The temple is 1000–2000 years old and dedicated to Shiva. Hymns on the temple have been composed by the Nayanmars Campantar, Appar and Sundarar. Lakshmi, the consort of Vishnu is believed to have worshipped Vishnu in the temple and hence the presiding deity is called Mahalakshmeeswarar..

Legend 

According to legend, a Chola king was travelling through the place when the torch carried by his men went off. It automatically started burning when the entourage had crossed the spot. On inquiring from a local shepherd, the king learnt that a holy shivalinga had been buried at the spot. The king found the shivalinga and built a temple to Shiva.

Tirunindriyur is also believed to be the place where Shiva gave darshan to Parasurama in order to relieve him of the sin of matricide.

References

External links 

 

Shiva temples in Mayiladuthurai district
Padal Petra Stalam
Maadakkoil